Minnesota Legal Marijuana Now is a political third party in the U.S. state of Minnesota established in 1998 to oppose drug prohibition.

Minnesota Legal Marijuana Now became a major party in Minnesota in 2018 when their candidate for State Auditor, Michael Ford, received 5.3 percent of the vote. During the 2010s the party began expansion attempts to other states, continuing during the 2020s, as the Legal Marijuana Now Party.

In 2020, the Minnesota Legal Marijuana Now nominee for United States Senator received 190,154 votes in the November 3 election, the largest number of votes received in 2020, in the U.S., by any such third-party candidate. Democrats have stated that Legal Marijuana Now candidates are detrimental to the Democratic Party. An analysis of votes cast in the 2020 Minnesota elections found that Legal Marijuana Now candidates might have helped Democratic candidates in swing districts, by pulling a greater number of votes from Republican candidates.

Scholars have credited Legal Marijuana Now Party with influencing the Minnesota Democratic Party to champion bills legalizing a regulated cannabis market, in the 2020s.

History

Background before 1998
The Minnesota Grassroots Party was formed in 1986 as a response to Ronald Reagan's War on Drugs.
In 1996 the party split, with some former members forming the Independent Grassroots Party for one election cycle.

1998—2012
In 1998, members of the Independent Grassroots Party formed the Minnesota Legal Marijuana Now political party.

Minnesota does not allow voters to petition to put the law itself onto the ballot for a vote. The only petition the people can use in Minnesota is to nominate independent and third party candidates for office.

2014—2018
In 2014, Dan Vacek ran for Minnesota Attorney General as the Legal Marijuana Now candidate and got 57,604 votes, qualifying the party to be officially recognized and to receive public funding from the state.

Minnesota Legal Marijuana Now held their first convention and adopted a party constitution on November 26, 2014. Founding members Oliver Steinberg, Marty Super, and Dan Vacek comprised the organization's 2015 leadership council.

In 2016, Michael Ford was elected chairperson of the Minnesota Legal Marijuana Now Party. From 2018—2019, Marty Super served as chairperson. Tim Davis became chairperson of Minnesota Legal Marijuana Now in 2020.

The Legal Marijuana Now Party placed a candidate, Zach Phelps, on the ballot in the Minnesota State Senate District 35 Special Election, in February 2016. 

Minnesota Legal Marijuana Now nominated candidates by petition to appear on the ballot for the November 6, 2018 election. Their candidate for State Auditor, Michael Ford, who is African-American, received 133,913 votes or 5.28%, qualifying Minnesota Legal Marijuana Now Party to be an official major party in the state, which gives Legal Marijuana Now candidates ballot access without the task of having to petition.

2019—2020
The Legal Marijuana Now Party placed a candidate, John “Sparky” Birrenbach, of Pine City on the ballot in the Minnesota State Senate District 11 Special Election, in February 2019.

In 2020, Legal Marijuana Now candidate Adam Weeks who was on the ballot in Minnesota's 2nd congressional district where Democratic Representative Angie Craig was seeking re-election in a close race, died four weeks before the November 3 election, throwing the election into chaos because a Minnesota state law said that if a major party candidate died during an election campaign, a special election would be held. Prior to his death, Weeks had boasted in a voicemail left for an estranged friend that a Republican had offered him money to run against the Republican and Democratic candidates. Federal judges ruled that the election should go ahead because federal law setting the date of the election preempted the state law, so the name of the candidate, Paula Overby, who was nominated by Legal Marijuana Now Party to replace Weeks, was not on the ballot. State Legal Marijuana Now Party leaders encouraged their supporters to cast their votes for Weeks, in memoriam, and the dead candidate received 5.83% of votes in the three-way race.

During the 2020 election campaign, Minnesota Democratic Party leaders said that the Legal Marijuana Now Party made it harder for DFL candidates to win. But a St. Cloud Times analysis of votes cast in the November 3, 2020, election found that the marijuana candidates took at least as many votes, if not more, from Republican candidates than they took from Democratic candidates.

Kevin O’Connor, the Legal Marijuana Now nominee for United States Senator in 2020, received 190,154 votes in the November 3 election, the largest number of votes received by any such third-party candidate nationwide.

2021—2022

2021 municipal elections 
Legal Marijuana Now congressional candidate Mickey Moore entered the 2021 Ward 9 Minneapolis City Council race. In the nonpartisan municipal election, Moore was endorsed by the Minneapolis Area DFL Senior Caucus, Operation Safety Now, Minneapolis’ firefighters union. Other candidates in the race had endorsements including the Minneapolis Democratic Party, Twin Cities Democratic Socialists, Somali Business Association.

2022 congressional District 1 special election 
Minnesota Legal Marijuana Now Party nominated Richard Reisdorf of Mankato, a disabled American war veteran, to run for United States Representative from Minnesota's 1st congressional district in the August 9, 2022, special election.

2022 gubernatorial primary 
On August 9, 2022, Minnesota Legal Marijuana Now Party held a gubernatorial primary between James McCaskel & David Sandbeck and Chris Wright & L.C. Converse. McCaskel was nominated for Governor of Minnesota by 52% of Legal Marijuana Now voters.

2022 Minnesota state elections 
In 2022, Minnesota Legal Marijuana Now Party nominated substitute teacher and former city clerk Eric Leitzen for Minnesota State Senator from District 26.

In the District 54A race for Minnesota State Representative, Legal Marijuana Now Party nominated Ryan Martin, an automobile mechanic who was the party’s nominee for District 55A representative in 2020.

2022 federal elections 
Paula Overby, a supporter of Bernie Sanders who sought the DFL nomination for U.S. Senator in 2020, was nominated by Minnesota Legal Marijuana Now Party, in 2022, to run for U.S. Representative from the 2nd congressional district. Overby, an information technology director and author of the 2017 book The Transgender Myth: Through the Gender Looking Glass, had previously been nominated by Legal Marijuana Now Party for the 2nd congressional district in 2020 after candidate Adam Weeks' death. Overby’s platform included marijuana legalization and universal Medicare.

According to Representative Craig, Minnesota's 2nd congressional district is an independent stronghold. "About one-third of the voters lean Democrat, one-third lean Republican, and the other third of voters don't really like Democrats or Republicans. They like their personal rights and freedoms and don't want politicians telling them what to do," Craig said in November.

On October 5, 2022, Overby died during recovery in a hospital following surgery for a heart valve condition. Minnesota Secretary of State Steve Simon stated that due to a 2021 federal court ruling in the wake of Adam Weeks' death, the congressional election would go ahead as scheduled on November 8th, and Overby's name would remain on the ballot. Without remedy for replacing their deceased nominee, under state law, Legal Marijuana Now encouraged supporters to cast their votes for Overby. The party was joined in support of voting in memoriam by Right Now USA, a conservative political action committee, while the Minnesota D—F—L Party paid for advertisements against Legal Marijuana Now, in District 2. The dead candidate in 2022, Overby, won 10,728 votes in the race.

In the 2022 election for United States Representative from District 7, Travis "Bull" Johnson, a Beltrami, Minnesota goat farmer and U.S. Army veteran, was endorsed by former District 7 Representative Collin Peterson, a Democrat who held the office for 30 years, from 1991 to 2021. Legal Marijuana Now candidate Johnson got 16,421 votes, placing fourth highest out of 126 contests nationally, in 2022, with third party or independent candidates in three-way races.

Since 2023

2023 Minnesota Senate hearings 
During testimony supporting Minnesota Senate File 73 to create a regulated commercial cannabis market, at the bill's first Minnesota Senate committee hearing, in 2023, Oliver Steinberg, a Legal Marijuana Now Party founder, said that marijuana prohibition has not stopped people from using cannabis, but prohibition has "succeeded perhaps in terrorizing or intimidating citizens, in canceling civil liberties, blighting both urban and rural communities, all without eradicating the outlawed substance." Some political scholars have remarked that Minnesota's single-issue marijuana parties and strong third parties such as Independence, which evolved from Governor Jesse Ventura's Reform Party, influenced the state Democratic—Farmer—Labor Party to champion Minnesota Senate File 73, in the 2020s.

Electoral history

1998 election results

2014—2018 election results

Results in 2019—2022 Minnesota state elections

Results in 2022 Minnesota gubernatorial election

Results in 2020—2022 federal elections

Further reading

Simons, Abby (November 5, 2014) Minors Lead on Marijuana Star Tribune
Gettman, Jon (February 9, 2016) Minnesota Maverick Pushes Legalization Platform in Special Election High Times
Bierschbach, Briana (November 7, 2018) Minnesota poised to get two new major pot parties Minnesota Public Radio
Legal Marijuana Now Party Gains Traction WCCO-TV, November 7, 2018
Bierschbach, Briana & Van Berkel, Jessie (November 5, 2020) Marijuana candidates shake up Minnesota races Star Tribune

See also
 Cannabis political parties of the United States

References

External links

facebook.com/LMN.Minnesota

1998 establishments in Minnesota
Cannabis law reform organizations based in the United States
Cannabis in Minnesota
Cannabis political parties of the United States
Drug policy organizations based in the United States
Single-issue political parties
Political parties established in 1998
Political parties in Minnesota
Progressive parties in the United States
Social democratic parties in the United States